Myrcia rupestris is a species of plant in the family Myrtaceae, endemic to south-east Brazil, and first described in 2015.

Etymology 
The species name refers to the plant's rocky habitat.

Description 
Myrcia rupestris is a shrub or small tree that grows to between 0.5 and 3 metres tall. Leaves grow up to 26mm long and 9mm wide. Fruits grow up to 5mm wide with up to 2 seeds.

Distribution 
This plant has only been found on rock outcrops in Minas Gerais.

Conservation status 
Myrcia rupestris is considered to be endangered due to its limited distribution.

References 

rupestris
Tropical fruit
Flora of South America
Endemic flora of Brazil
Fruits originating in South America
Fruit trees
Berries
Plants described in 2015